"Gloria" is a single by American folk rock band The Lumineers from their third studio album III (2019). The song was released on April 4, 2019 by Dualtone Records and Decca Records, with the accompanying music video being released on May 20, 2019.

Background 
The song is the third track from their third studio album III, and was released as a single on April 4, 2019 by Dualtone and Decca Records.

Charts

Weekly charts

Year-end charts

Certifications

Release history

References 

2019 singles
2019 songs
The Lumineers songs